Pern is a fictional planet, the setting for the Dragonriders of Pern novel series. 

Pern or PERN may also refer to:

 European honey buzzard, a bird of prey also known as the pern
The title character of The Life of Rock with Brian Pern, a British spoof-documentary series
 Pakistan Educational Research Network, connects universities and research institutes via high-speed Internet
 PERN Przyjaźń SA, a Polish oil transportation and storage company
 PERN, Pernem railway station's station code